The Masonic Temple in Downtown Berkeley, California is a historic building listed on the National Register of Historic Places. It is located at 2105 Bancroft Way at the corner of Shattuck Avenue, just one block west of the University of California, Berkeley.  The Classical Revival style building, designed by William H. Wharff, was built in 1905. The building was built for Berkeley's Masons, who started a local lodge in 1882 and formed the Berkeley Masonic Temple Association to build the temple. In 1944, the building was converted to a bank. The ground floor of the building is now unoccupied and the remaining floors are used by University staff, including the California Center for Innovative Transportation and the National Writing Project.

The building was added to the National Register on July 15, 1982.

See also 

 Freemasonry
 Sigma Phi Society of the Thorsen House

References

Former Masonic buildings in California
Masonic buildings completed in 1905
Clubhouses on the National Register of Historic Places in California
Buildings and structures in Berkeley, California
National Register of Historic Places in Berkeley, California
Neoclassical architecture in California
1905 establishments in California